Thug or THUG may refer to:

People
 Thug, a common criminal, who treats others violently and roughly, often for hire
 Thug, a member of the former Indian cult Thuggee
 Thug Behram (ca 1765–1840), leader of the Thuggee cult

Video game
 Tony Hawk's Underground (slang acronym), a video game

Film and literature
Thug (film), an upcoming film starring Liam Neeson
The Hate U Give, young adult novel
The Hate U Give (film)

Music
 ThugLine Records, a record label
 Thug Life, a hip hop group created by Tupac Shakur
 Les Thugs, a punk band from France
 Mr. Thug, vocalist of the Hip hop group Bonde da Stronda
 Young Thug, Atlanta-based rapper

Albums
 Thug Life: Volume 1, an album by Thug Life
 T.H.U.G.S. (Flesh-n-bone album), a 1996 album by Flesh-N-Bone
 T.H.U.G.S. (Bone Thugs-n-Harmony album), a 2007 album by Bone Thugs-n-Harmony

Songs
 "Thug", written by Linden Hudson, a song from the ZZ Top album Eliminator
 "'T.H.U.G (True Hero Under God)", a song by Z-Ro from I'm Still Livin'
 "I'm Not A Thug", a single by Plastic Little from Welcome to the Jang House
 "Thug", a song by Slim Thug from Boss of All Bosses
 "Mansão Thug Stronda", a song by Bonde da Stronda from the album Nova Era da Stronda
 "Thug in Me", a song by Spice 1 on his solo album The Black Bossalini from 1997

See also
 Tupac: A Thug Life, a non-fiction anthology released by Plexus Publishing and written by various music writers and authors about the life of Tupac Shakur